Anti-Vietnamese sentiment involves hostility or hatred that is directed towards Vietnamese people, or the state of Vietnam.

Background 
Anti-Vietnamese sentiment, known on the lesser version as Vietnamophobia and Anti-Vietnamism, has a strong and deep historical root for more than thousand years since the establishment of Đại Việt. There are several features behind this anti-Vietnamese hatred below:

 Organized persecution of the Vietnamese as a nation or as an ethnic group, often based on the belief that Vietnamese interests are a threat to one's own national aspirations;
 Racist anti-Vietnamese sentiment, a variety of xenophobia;
 Cultural anti-Vietnamese sentiment: a prejudice against the Vietnamese and Vietnamese-speaking persons – their customs, language and education; and
 Stereotypes about Vietnam and Vietnamese people in the media and popular culture.

Anti-Vietnamese acts had been long organized by various countries and ethnicities opposing the existence of Vietnam as a country and the fear over Vietnamese people's takeover, both direct and indirect forms. Chinese dynasties used to extend its level of anti-Vietnamese persecutions from imprisoning, hanging to even massacres in large scales, notably under the Ming dynasty which the Chinese organized massacring methods from burning to beheading with no mercy; or the famine of 1945 in which the Empire of Japan was believed to attempt on a brutal extermination of possible Vietnamese resistance against Japanese rule. Smaller states like Cambodia also organized massacres on Vietnamese, in which notably under Lon Nol and Khmer Rouge, justifying that Vietnam wanted to takeover Cambodia and making it a province. Historic actions inspired by anti-Vietnamism ranged from felonious acts motivated by hatred, to physical extermination of the Vietnamese nation, the goal of which was to eradicate the Vietnamese state.

Historical context 
The Siamese, and later, the Thais, following the Vietnamese expansions and occupation in the 15th century, became extremely frightened and hostile towards Vietnam. The Siamese had waged a number of wars against Vietnam since the 18th century, but they had not won another war after the successful first ransack in 1712. This facilitated Vietnamophobia among the Siamese. Similar to the Cambodians, Thais also referred to the Vietnamese as "Youn", a derogatory term similar in meaning to "barbarian", which is a corruption of "Yona", a Pali and Sanskrit term for "Greek"(Due to the invasion and subsequent establishment of the "foreign" Indo-Greek Kingdom). 

Despite that, the real meanings of yuon, youn and yona/yavana had been altered or misunderstood by early French and colonial era orientalists. Michael Vickery wrote: "There was once a consensus among historians of Southeast Asia that yuon in the sense of Vietnamese derived from Sanskrit yavana, defined in the most authoritative Sanskrit-English dictionary (Monier Monier-Williams, p 848), as "Ionian, Greek [barbarians?], later also Mohammedan, European, and any foreigner or barbarian". This, remember, was usage in India from ancient times, and in itself has no significance for yavana or yuon in Southeast Asia." He continues, "As for the Buddhist Institute Dictionary, popularly called the dictionary of the Venerable Chuon Nath, it defines yuon simply as inhabitants of Vietnam, says nothing about yavana, but includes yona, or yonaka, in the classical Indian sense, as a name for "Western Laos", which is what the French called northern Thailand, and also notes that the original yonaka country was Greece. No connection is made in that context between yonaka and yuon as a name for Vietnamese, nor is "barbarian" given as the meaning of any of these terms. This dictionary also correctly distinguishes the kamboja of ancient India from kambuja." In conclusion, Vickery argues that the term yuon had been intendedly misinterpreted by some colonial era orientalists, and some later agencies willfully weaponized that misinterpretation, such as the Khmer Rouge, to legalize xenophobia and ethnic hatred. However, Thai "Yuon" actually derived from Jiāozhǐ (交趾, Old Chinese: kraw), an ancient Chinese toponym for Northern Vietnam, which ultimately would have emerged from the Austroasiatic *k(ə)ra:w "human being". In Lao, the Vietnamese are referred by colloquial name of keo, derived from Kæw.

With the subsequent French military occupation of Vietnam as a consequence of Vietnam's persecution of the Catholic population by the Nguyễn dynasty after Gia Long, French colonial rulers considered Vietnamese an inferior race, calling them "Annamites", even towards Vietnamese elites. Originally referring to northern Vietnamese, it became a symbol of widespread discrimination and anti-Vietnamism. Mass uprisings against French colonial overlords increased, and the French tightened their grip on the Vietnamese with more brutal and infamous punishments, including deportations to New Caledonia. French colonial rule would be soon disrupted by the Japanese, but the attitude remained the same, even after World War II, until the Battle of Điện Biên Phủ.

The Japanese occupation of Vietnam in 1940 placed it under the control of two empires. Japanese and French mismanagement caused the famine of 1945, which Japanese soldiers refused to give rice to the Vietnamese peasantry to help their war effort, that killed between 1 and 2 million Vietnamese, an act that contributed to the distrust of Japanese administration in Vietnamese.

Following the French Indochina War was the Vietnam War and American involvement therein. Although the American intervention on behalf of their South Vietnamese ally received a mixed reception. American soldiers committed massacres during the war, with the most infamous being the Mỹ Lai Massacre, and also controversially used Agent Orange. Unlike China, France, Japan, Thailand, Laos or Cambodia, however, anti-Vietnamese sentiment in the U.S. and among American troops was scarce, being limited to some factions of the military and government; some American groups even sympathized with Vietnamese people.

The end of the Vietnam War, as an unwanted consequence, made Vietnamophobia grow rapidly among both Asian communists and non-communists alike, such as in China, Thailand, Singapore, North Korea, Malaysia and Cambodia, as the fear of a Vietnamese Intermarium, based on the idea of Poland's Józef Piłsudski, that sought to turn Southeast Asia into a communist/anti-Chinese base increased. The previous Lon Nol government and even the Khmer Rouge encouraged anti-Vietnamese massacres, blaming them for trying to colonize Cambodia, such as the Ba Chúc massacre. In Thailand, the possibility of Vietnamese invasions prompted hostility against anything Vietnamese in Thailand, leading to wide range support for the Khmer Rouge. Singapore and Malaysia also called for sanctions against Vietnam with the accusation of Vietnamese imperialism in Cambodia. North Korea, meanwhile, accused Vietnam for the same reason and supported anti-Vietnamese movement, hosting Norodom Sihanouk and broadcast anti-Vietnamese propaganda in North Korea. Pirates also attacked and raided Vietnamese boat people fleeing from Vietnam, although whether this was inspired by anti-Vietnamese sentiment is not known to be true.

This trend of anti-Vietnamese sentiment only started to slow down after Đổi mới, which Vietnam started economic liberalization and reforms, opening Vietnam to the world which gave them a rising profile of political and economic successes with normalization of the U.S. and China's relations; however due to historical traumas, attitude towards Vietnam and Vietnamese remain questionable in a number of countries due to its previous past, particularly in Cambodia, Laos and China.

Media reference to Vietnam War 

Although in general, the view on Vietnam and Vietnamese in majority is positive since the Vietnamese economic reforms post-1986; the memoirs of the Vietnam War may prove to be a greater consequence and can downplay the positive image of Vietnam.

The most notable is the use of Việt Cộng, which is very dependent on context. The term may be used to invoke memories of North Vietnamese war crimes on other Vietnamese people. It may be used to insult Vietnamese people, or provoke an angry response towards Vietnamese people, mostly from former South Vietnamese refugees, Vietnamese in Western Europe and Vietnamese Americans, particularly due to grudges held about the war crimes and traumas of the war associated with North Vietnamese massacres on Vietnamese suspected to be American/South Vietnamese agents.

On the other hand, the use of "Việt Cộng" can also provoke anger among Vietnamese in the native country and from the diaspora in Eastern Europe as well, due to this reference being used to evoke memories of previous American war crimes, since American and American-allied troops could not distinguish Việt Cộng from normal Vietnamese citizens or those suspected to be Việt Cộng agents, and so large swathes of innocent Vietnamese lives were razed and massacred by American and American-allied troops.

Incidents by country

Thailand 

Anti-Vietnamese sentiment in Thailand has been the direct result of Vietnamese expansionism in the past, with indication of fears about Vietnamese conquest in the history. Since the war between two started at 18th century, Siam had only won one direct conflict, with the others were all indecisive or Siamese defeats to the Vietnam, manifested the theory of Vietnamese aggression and imperialism on Thai people. Thailand also later participated in the Vietnam War, and took prides for its participation.

When the Khmer Rouge was overthrown in Cambodia, Thailand was one of the main countries that harbored Khmer Rouge's leader and provided them ammunition against Vietnamese forces, owning by the old historical fear against Vietnamese invasion, and accusation over Vietnamese plan to invade Thailand inflamed anti-Vietnamese sentiment in Thailand.

Cambodia 

Anti-Vietnamese sentiment in Cambodia dates back to the Khmer Empire, because the Khmer Empire, as a Chinese vassal, was constantly raiding and coinspiring with China's dynasties to attack the Vietnamese in pincer attacks. The Khmers who sparsely inhabited the Mekong Delta started to become inundated by Vietnamese settlers that were allowed to settle by the Cambodian king at the time and in response the Vietnamese were subjected to Cambodian retaliation. After the Vietnamese successfully annexed Champa, they then moved to conquer the Khmers on the Mekong Delta. Following the beginning of French Cochinchina with the arrival of European troops and missionaries, the Cambodians told Catholic European envoys that the Vietnamese government's persecution of Catholics justified the launching of retaliatory attacks against the Vietnamese colonists in Cambodia.

Antipathy against the Vietnamese peaked under the Khmer rouge. In 1978, under the administration of Democratic Kampuchea, especially when Cambodian socialists began to rebel in the eastern zone of Cambodia, Pol Pot ordered his armies to exterminate 1.5 million eastern Cambodians which he branded as "Cambodian with Vietnamese minds" along with the 50 million Vietnamese in the area. This led to a war with the Vietnamese when they began to retaliate for the inhumane genocide and subsequently overthrew the Khmer Rouge. Norodom Sihanouk, the King of Cambodia at the time, asked United States President Lyndon B. Johnson to send American forces to Cambodia in order to liberate it from the Viet Cộng but his request was to no avail.

In the 21st century, anti-Vietnamese sentiment occasionally flares up in Cambodia due to the Cambodian people's fear that Vietnam will take over their land one day and some Cambodian opposition politicians continue to exploit this issue in order to justify their hatred of the Vietnamese. That fear was illustrated by attacks against Vietnamese which resulted in the rape and murder of several Vietnamese in the country.

China 

As China had occupied the Vietnamese people for 1000 years, there has been a long uneasy sentiment towards China by the Vietnamese and vice versa. Nonetheless, anti-Vietnamese expressions have been dated back longer in Chinese history, especially following the Lý–Song War, during which the Vietnamese army under Lý Thường Kiệt invaded southern Guangxi and parts of southwestern Guangdong in response to attacks from the Song dynasty. More than 250,000–400,000 troops and civilians died (including massacre of Yongzhou) and more than half of Song troops died during the counteroffensive against Đại Việt. Chinese historical sources exaggeratedly stated seven million Vietnamese casualties inflicted by Chinese forces during the retaliatory campaign. Brutality against the Vietnamese continued during the Fourth Chinese domination of Vietnam. After its independence, the newly founded Lê dynasty waged several wars against Champa, a Chinese-aligned polity to the east of the Khmer Empire.

During the Sino-Vietnamese War, when China had invaded Vietnam, the Chinese claimed that Vietnamese had invaded them instead and saw the war as self defense despite being the one who launched the attack. The war is still taught in China as a "war of resistance against Vietnamese invasion".

Recent tensions in the South China Sea have caused more disdain towards the Vietnamese by the Chinese community. In retaliation to territorial disputes, a Chinese restaurant in Beijing refused to serve food to Vietnamese tourists, alongside Filipinos and Japanese. The feelings are also reciprocated from the latter, not just from disputes but also because of COVID-19.

Japan
Vietnamese people in Japan, among one of Japan's largest foreign communities, have expressed concerns about stereotyping and discrimination. Japan's Ministry of Public Security says that Vietnamese nationals are the foreign group with the highest rate of crime, and Vietnamese people in the country say they have been treated with suspicion and hostility.

Taiwan
Due to large number of Vietnamese prostitutes and brides in Taiwan, Vietnamese women are stereotyped to be prostitutes or mail order brides in Taiwan. Vietnamese brides living in Taiwan have been subject to abusive households and ethnic discrimination by locals.

Myanmar
The people of Myanmar began to express hatred towards Vietnam as well as China and ASEAN countries after the protests, because of suspicions of expressing support for the military government. Mytel, a Viettel's subsidiary, along with Vietnamese companies have been targeted by protesters.

Russia 

Hatred towards foreigners especially to non-white people began to rise in Russia as they were blamed for the country's 10 years of failed reforms in which living standards plummeted. Prior to the Chechen–Russian conflict, especially when Russian authorities blamed the Chechen Muslims Jihadist as responsible in the Russian apartment bombings, this has fuelled more hatred towards immigrants in the country. Prior to this, Russian skinheads began to be formed with some of the group members joining to take revenge for their family members that had been killed during the bomb attacks, though some other Russians joined the group because they are just "bored" and want to bully people. Following the attack against Vietnamese in Russia, protests were held by the Vietnamese community in the country, especially after the murder of 20-year-old Vietnamese student, Vu Anh Tuan on 13 October 2004. The protesters state:

Despite the protest for protection from Russian authorities, Vietnamese people continue to be attacked. On 25 December 2004, two Vietnamese students at the Moscow Energy Institute, Nguyễn Tuấn Anh and Nguyen Hoàng Anh suffered severe injuries and were subsequently hospitalised after they had been assaulted by a group of strangers with knives and clubs on the way back to their dormitory. On 13 March 2005, three Russians stabbed a 45-year-old Vietnamese man named Quân to death in front of his home in Moscow. On 22 March 2008, a 35-year-old Vietnamese woman who worked at a Moscow market stabbed to death in an apparent race-hate killing. On 9 January 2009, a group of strangers in Moscow stabbed a 21-year-old Vietnamese student named Tăng Quốc Bình resulting in his death the next day.

Amid continuous attacks against Vietnamese students and workers, around 600 Vietnamese were rounded up in August 2013 in the city of Moscow and placed in poor condition tents while waiting to be deported from Russia.

North Caucasus 
Reports about growing Vietnamese population in North Caucasus have resulted in several ethnic violence between ethnic Vietnamese and North Caucasian peoples, notably occurred in Chechnya and Ingushetia. Following a rumor about Chechens being killed by Vietnamese employers, it had sparked uproar and anti-Vietnamese sentiment in social media. In 2013, violence broke out in Malgobek between Vietnamese and Ingush workers, with the Chechens supporting the Ingush, resulting with deaths of several Vietnamese. A year before, ethnic violence between Vietnamese and Ingush also broke out, with the Ingush accused the authorities of Vietnamization of Ingushetia.

United States 

Tension and hatred between Vietnamese immigrants and white fishermen rose up in Galveston Bay, Texas in 1981, and was intensified by the Ku Klux Klan following an invitation from the American fishermen to threatening and intimidating the Vietnamese to leave, which resulted in attacks on Vietnamese boats.

In April 1988, Mark Wahlberg attacked a Vietnamese-American veteran from the Vietnam war with a wooden stick and blinded his eye, calling him "Vietnam fucking shits". Wahlberg attacked a second Vietnamese-American man later the same day, punching him in the eye. When Wahlberg was arrested and returned to the scene of the first assault, he told police officers: "I'll tell you now that's the mother-fucker whose head I split open."

Vietnamese business owners, along with Korean Americans were disproportionately targeted during the Rodney King Riots, a result of misdirected anger and hatred.

In June 2020, Matthew Hubbard, a mathematics professor at Laney College, allegedly asked Vietnamese student Phúc Bùi Điệm Nguyễn to "anglicize" her name because he believed it sounded like an offensive phrase in English. Ironically it is the anglicisation that caused offence, and not her true name with diacritics.

Derogatory terms 
 Annamite or mites (French) – Originally generalised as a colonialist synonym for all Vietnamese.
 Gook – A derogatory slur for Vietnamese and East Asians. It was originally used by the United States Armed Forces during wartime, especially during the Vietnam War.
Gaew แกว – A Thai slang word for people who is of Vietnamese descent in Thailand.
 Uzkoglázy (узкоглазый) – East Asian Russian slur meaning "small eyes" or in Russian referring to the prevalence of epicanthic folds in Asian ethnic groups.
 Yuon (យួន) - Khmer slang for "thief" is commonly used in Cambodia to refer to Vietnamese people. It's used in local media and by politicians

See also 

 Racism
 Racism in Vietnam

References 

 
Vietnam
Racism
Vietnam